This is a list of the number-one hits and albums of 2000 on Italian Charts.

See also
2000 in music
List of number-one hits in Italy

References

External links
Hit Parade Italia
FIMI archives

2000
2000 in Italian music
2000 record charts